The Macau Business Management Educational Centre (MEC) was established in 2005 and has registered with Education and Youth Affairs Bureau, Government of Macau (Registration Number: 362/2008) as an institution specializing in senior business management and professional distinction for adult learners. Since established in 2005, MEC has been providing vocational courses to working adults like entrepreneurs, managers, supervisors and people who endeavor to become leaders in the business world in the region. Besides classroom teaching and lectures; interactive discussion, seminars, and enterprise exchanges are also regularly conducted for over 3,000 graduates to enhance their knowledge outside their career scope.

History 

2005    -Established Macau Business Management Educational Centre in Macau.

2006-8 - In collaboration with world class universities and professional associations. MEC offered various types of management and psychology programs to over 1,000 entrepreneurs and adult workers in the region in collaboration with Hong Kong Baptist University, Tsinghua University and Fudan University, and professional training courses for future accountants and certified financial analysts to acquire  qualifications from American Institute of Certified Public Accountants (AICPA), Certified Public Accountant Australia (CPA Australia) by collaboration with American Becker Professional Education.

2009  - Implemented  professional certificates and diploma programs from LiPACE, Open University of Hong Kong in Macau  with great success, including professional programs in Management, Public Relations, Wedding Planner, Certified Financial Planner (CFP), Financial Risk Management (FRM) and many others. MEC has been working with OUHK for over 6 years up to now.

2012 - Received &ldquo;Quality Mark -Quality Assure Level&rdquo; by the Global Examinational Board of University of East London (UEL Global Examinational Board).

2013 - Setting up MECI at Hong Kong, focussing in international courses with Singapore, Malaysia, Vietnam and Mainland China.

2014 - Established School of International Studies with Zhuhai Art College, a licensed postsecondary college in Zhuhai with over 3,000 students and self owned campus.  MEC has been providing a lot of management training courses and seminars to local banks including Bank of China and Wing Hang Bank, and large hotels and casinos in Macau in Year 2014, including the trainings to over 70 management staff  in Tak Chun Group, a famous gambling organization in Macau with branches in Philippines and Korea.

Programs 
MEC offers various programmes at different level each year, including:

OUHK Professional Courses 
 Professional Diploma in Personal Financial Management (awarded by OUHK LiPACE)

Other Professional Courses 
 Professional Certificate for International Wedding Planners (jointly awarded by KATEMAGG & trade and MEC)

Certificate and Diploma 
 Higher Certificate Program of Applied Psychology of Management and Administrative Personnel (awarded by 珠海清華科技園教育中心)

Continuing Education Development Plan 2014-2016 
All Macanese citizens over 15 years of age are eligible to study courses approved under the Continuing Education Development Plan 2014-2016 organised by Macau's Education and Youth Bureau (教育暨青年局). 
 Mediation Skills Level 1
 Entrepreneurship and Profits via the Internet programme
 Project Coordination and Banquet Decoration
 Upgrade Your Parenting Skills
 Better ways of Communicating with Children
 Training for Playgroup Tutor
 Management for Mental Health
 Mind Reading
 To Know Your Partners, To Win Your Career
 Emotional Health of the Elderly
 Conquer Anxiety, Release Pressure
 IELTS Exam Preparation Course
 Social English Conversation

IELTS 
 IELTS Premium Course - standard English Level

Partners in Collaboration

Hong Kong & Macau 
♦ Li Ka Shing Institute of Professional and Continuing Education and School of Science and Technology, Open University of Hong Kong

♦ King's Glory Education Centre

♦ Katemagg Event & Wedding

Mainland China 

♦ Zhuhai Tsinghua Science Park Education Center (珠海清華科技園教育中心)

Academic Advisory Team 
 Dr David A.Shore, PhD
Professor of Harvard University

 Dr Chui Heung Heung
Professor of NUS Business School

 Dr. Chan Ping Yee
Gambling psychology mentor

 Dr. Cheung Sou Ma Lei
General Manager of Macao Ching Wah Enterprises Limited

 Dr. Ng Lee Fan
Board chairman of Ng Kam Kei Construction co., Ltd.

 Dr Iu Veng Ion
President of Macao Joy Post

See also
 Education in Macau

References

External links
 Official website

Educational institutions established in 2005
Education in Macau
2005 establishments in Macau